The olive-capped flowerpecker (Dicaeum nigrilore) is a species of bird in the family Dicaeidae. It is endemic to the island of Mindanao in the Philippines.Its natural habitat is tropical moist montane forest.

Description and Taxonomy 
EBird describes the bird as "A small, rather long-billed bird of montane forest on Mindanao. Olive-green on the back, darker on the edge of the wing, with a golden-olive head, a pale gray throat separated from the head color by a black line, a pale gray chest, and pale yellow on the sides and under the base of the tail. Note the black legs and the red eye. Somewhat similar to Olive-backed flowerpecker, but has a longer bill and a yellowish lower belly. Voice includes a high-pitched upslurred whistle and a rough “jiik!”."  Often seen feeding on fruiting and flowering trees.

Subspecies 
Two subspecies are recognized

 Dicaeum nigrilore nigrilore: : Found in West, Central and Southern Mindanao ; more visible yellow rump
 Dicaeum nigrilore diuatae: Found in Northeast Mindanao; overall darker green and drabber in overall color and greenish yellow rump

and a possible third subspecies found in Southeast Mindanao which has a yellowish-green head. Further study needed on this potential subspecies.

Habitat and Conservation Status 
It inhabits tropic moist sub-montane and montane forest above 900 masl. 

IUCN has assessed this bird as a least-concern species. Despite a limited range, it is said to be locally common in its range. As it occurs in rugged and inaccessible mountains, this has allowed a large portion of its habitat to remain intact. However, there it is still affected by habitat loss through deforestation, mining, land conversion and slash-and-burn - just not to the same extent as lowland forest.

References

olive-capped flowerpecker
Birds of Mindanao
olive-capped flowerpecker
Taxonomy articles created by Polbot